James Horsfield (born 21 September 1995) is an English professional footballer who plays as a right back.

Career

Manchester City
Horsfield came through Manchester City's youth system, signing on as a first year scholar in July 2012, having been at the club for ten years. In July 2015 he scored a penalty against Roma in the International Champions Cup in Melbourne. In 2017 Horsfield signed a one-year contract extension, extending his deal at the club to June 2018.

Doncaster Rovers (loan)
On 28 September 2015, Horsfield signed for Doncaster Rovers on a 28-day emergency loan deal. He made his debut a day later. He made a total of 3 appearances and returned to City.

NAC Breda (loan)
On 17 January 2017, Horsfield was sent on loan to Dutch Eerste Divisie side NAC Breda for the rest of the season. He made his debut on 3 February, against Den Bosch. On 13 March, Horsfield scored his first senior goal, in a 2–0 win over Fortuna Sittard.

NAC Breda
Following his loan period, Horsfield signed permanently for NAC Breda on 24 July 2017, signing a three-year contract at the Eredivisie club.

Scunthorpe United
On 17 July 2018, Horsfield signed for EFL League One club Scunthorpe United on a two-year contract. He made his league debut in the 2–1 away victory against Coventry City.

Horsfield was loaned to Dundee in January 2019.

Horsfield was again loaned out in October 2019, this time to Wrexham.

Wrexham

Horsfield would return to Wrexham on 15 September 2020, signing a one year deal after a successful trial with the club.

Chester 
On 17 September 2021, Horsfield signed a short-term deal with National League North side Chester.

Career statistics

References

External links

 

James Horsfield profile at Manchester City F.C.

1995 births
Living people
Footballers from Stockport
People from Hazel Grove
English footballers
Association football midfielders
Manchester City F.C. players
Doncaster Rovers F.C. players
NAC Breda players
Scunthorpe United F.C. players
Dundee F.C. players
Wrexham A.F.C. players
Eerste Divisie players
English Football League players
National League (English football) players
Eredivisie players
Scottish Professional Football League players
Chester F.C. players